The 2023 U-17 Africa Cup of Nations known as 2023 U17 AFCON for short and/or the TotalEnergies U-17 Africa Cup of Nations for sponsorship purposes, will be the 15th edition of the Africa U-17 Cup of Nations (20th edition if tournaments without hosts are included), the biennial international youth football tournament organized by the Confederation of African Football (CAF) for players aged 17 and below. In May 2021, it was decided that the tournament would be hosted by Algeria. 
This would have been the second edition of the Africa U-17 Cup of Nations to have expanded to twelve teams instead of eight.
The top four teams of the tournament will qualify for the 2023 FIFA U-17 World Cup in Peru as the CAF representatives.

Cameroon are the defending champions, having won the 2019 edition as the 2021 edition was cancelled.

Qualification

The CAF decided in July 2017 that the format of the qualifying competition should be changed and split according to zones. At the end of the qualification phase, eleven teams will join the hosts Algeria.

Player eligibility
Players born on 1 January 2006 or later are eligible to participate in the competition.

Qualified teams
The following twelve teams qualified for the final tournament.

Note: All appearance statistics count only those since the introduction of the final tournament in 1995.

Venues 
The Algerian Football Federation choose three venues in three cities across the host nation Algeria for hosting the competition: Algiers, Annaba and Constantine.

Match officials
Referees

Assistant referees

Video assistant referees

Squads

Draw
The draw of the final tournament was held on 1 February 2023, 12:00 WET (UTC±0), at the Cercle National de l'Armée in Algiers, Algeria, The twelve teams will be drawn into three groups of four teams. The hosts Algeria is seeded in Group A and allocated to position A1, while Cameroon the 2019 champions is seeded in Group C and allocated to position C1, and Nigeria the 2019 fourth place is seeded in Group B and allocated to position B1, while the remaining nine teams are seeded based on their results in the 2019 Africa U-17 Cup of Nations.

Group stage

Tiebreakers
Teams were ranked according to points (3 points for a win, 1 point for a draw, 0 points for a loss), and if tied on points, the following tiebreaking criteria were applied, in the order given, to determine the rankings (Regulations Article 13):
Points in head-to-head matches among tied teams;
Goal difference in head-to-head matches among tied teams;
Goals scored in head-to-head matches among tied teams;
If more than two teams are tied, and after applying all head-to-head criteria above, a subset of teams are still tied, all head-to-head criteria above are reapplied exclusively to this subset of teams;
Goal difference in all group matches;
Goals scored in all group matches;
Drawing of lots.

All times are local, WAT and CET (UTC+1).

Group A

Group B

Group C

Ranking of third-placed teams

Knockout stage

Bracket

Quarter finals
Winners qualify for 2023 FIFA U-17 World Cup.

Semi finals

Third place

Final

Goalscorers
There were 0 goals scored in 0 matches, for an average of 0 goals per match.

Qualified teams for FIFA U-17 World Cup
The following four teams from CAF qualified for the 2023 FIFA U-17 World Cup.

1 Bold indicates champions for that year. Italic indicates hosts for that year.

See also 
 2023 Africa U-20 Cup of Nations

References

External links
Official home of the 2023 edition at CAFOnline.com

U-17 Cup of Nations
2023 FIFA U-17 World Cup qualification
Africa U-17 Cup of Nations
2023
2023 Africa U-17 Cup of Nations